The Julia Street Memorial United Methodist Church is a historic church at 302 Thomas Avenue in Boaz, Alabama. It was built in a Classical Revival style and was added to the National Register of Historic Places in 1999.

References

Churches in Marshall County, Alabama
United Methodist churches in Alabama
Churches completed in 1917
National Register of Historic Places in Marshall County, Alabama
Churches on the National Register of Historic Places in Alabama
Neoclassical architecture in Alabama
Neoclassical church buildings in the United States